Tingena pronephela is a species of moth in the family Oecophoridae. It is endemic to New Zealand and is found in the southern parts of the South Island. The species inhabits the outskirts of scrub and native forest. The adults of this species are on the wing from October to February.

Taxonomy 
This species was first described by Edward Meyrick in 1907 using specimens collected by Alfred Philpott in Invercargill in December and named Borkhausenia pronephela. In 1915 Meyrick discussed this species under that name. In 1926 Philpott discussed and illustrated the genitalia of the male of this species. In 1928 George Hudson discussed and illustrated this species in his book The butterflies and moths of New Zealand. In 1988 J. S. Dugdale placed this species within the genus Tingena. The male lectotype is held at the Natural History Museum, London.

Description 

Meyrick originally described this species as follows:

Distribution  
This species is endemic to New Zealand and has been observed in the southern parts of the South Island including its type locality of Invercargill, at Bluecliff and in Dunedin.

Behaviour 
The adults of this species are on the wing from October to February.

Habitat 
This species inhabits the outskirts of scrub and native forest.

References

Oecophoridae
Moths of New Zealand
Moths described in 1907
Endemic fauna of New Zealand
Taxa named by Edward Meyrick
Endemic moths of New Zealand